Feliciano Barbosa (deceased) is a retired Portuguese footballer who played as a half-back.

He joined Benfica in 1933 but was seldom used in six years there. He won the league in 1937–38.

Career
Barbosa joined Benfica in 1933 and made his debut on 4 February 1934, against Sporting. It was the only time that Ribeiro dos Reis used him that season. In 1934–35, he only competed in the Campeonato de Lisboa and the next two seasons did not play at all, returning only on 7 November 1937 with Beleneses. He did play twice in the Primeira Liga, enough to win him the championship with Benfica.

His breakthrough season was in 1938–39, when he played 28 games in all competitions, scoring four goals, but Benfica failed to win any silverware. He left the club in 1939 with 45 games played and 8 goals scored.

Honours
Benfica
 Primeira Liga: 1937–38

References
General
 

Specific

Year of birth unknown
Year of death unknown
Portuguese footballers
Association football midfielders
Primeira Liga players
S.L. Benfica footballers